The 2021 Split Open was a professional tennis tournament played on clay courts. It was part of the 2021 ATP Challenger Tour. It took place in Split, Croatia between 5 and 11 April 2021.

Singles main-draw entrants

Seeds

 Rankings are as of 22 March 2021.

Other entrants
The following players received wildcards into the singles main draw:
  Duje Ajduković
  Mili Poljičak
  Nino Serdarušić

The following players received entry into the singles main draw using protected rankings:
  Dustin Brown
  Thanasi Kokkinakis

The following player received entry into the singles main draw as a special exempt:
  Zdeněk Kolář

The following player received entry into the singles main draw as an alternate:
  Kacper Żuk

The following players received entry from the qualifying draw:
  Mirza Bašić
  Uladzimir Ignatik
  Blaž Kavčič
  Akira Santillan

Champions

Singles

 Blaž Rola def.  Blaž Kavčič 2–6, 6–3, 6–2.

Doubles

  Andrey Golubev /  Aleksandr Nedovyesov def.  Szymon Walków /  Jan Zieliński 7–5, 6–7(5–7), [10–5].

References

2021 ATP Challenger Tour
2021 in Croatian tennis
April 2021 sports events in Croatia
Split Open